Alhassan Wakaso (born 7 January 1992) is a Ghanaian professional footballer who plays as a defensive midfielder or a central defender for Portuguese club Leixões.

Club career
Born in Tamale, Wakaso arrived in Portugal in 2009 at the age of 17, signing with Portimonense S.C. in the second division. On 28 October of the following year, when he was still a junior, he made his debut for the first team, featuring in a 2–3 away loss against C.D. Aves in the second round in the League Cup.

Wakaso was definitely promoted to the Algarve club's main squad for the 2011–12 season. On 23 December 2012, with the side still in the second level, he scored his first goal as a professional, in a 2–1 league win at Vitória S.C. B.

Wakaso moved to the Primeira Liga on 20 June 2013, signing with Rio Ave F.C. for three years. He made his debut in the competition for them on 18 August, starting and being replaced late into a 3–0 away victory over C.F. Os Belenenses.

In the last minutes of the January 2014 transfer window, Wakaso returned to Portimonense on a five-month loan. Three years later, he joined FC Lorient of the French Ligue 1 on a three-and-a-half-year contract. He returned to Portugal and its top tier in the following off-season, however, agreeing to a three-year deal at Vitória de Guimarães.

Wakaso missed the entire 2019–20 campaign, due to an injury to his right knee.

International career
Wakaso made his debut for Ghana on 26 March 2019, in a 3–1 friendly defeat of Mauritania.

Personal life
Wakaso's older brother, Mubarak, is also a footballer and a midfielder. He spent most of his career in Spain.

References

External links

1992 births
Living people
People from Northern Region (Ghana)
Dagomba people
Ghanaian Muslims
Ghanaian footballers
Association football defenders
Association football midfielders
Association football utility players
Primeira Liga players
Liga Portugal 2 players
Portimonense S.C. players
Rio Ave F.C. players
Vitória S.C. players
Leixões S.C. players
Ligue 1 players
FC Lorient players
Cypriot First Division players
Olympiakos Nicosia players
Ghana international footballers
Ghanaian expatriate footballers
Expatriate footballers in Portugal
Expatriate footballers in France
Expatriate footballers in Cyprus
Ghanaian expatriate sportspeople in Portugal
Ghanaian expatriate sportspeople in France
Ghanaian expatriate sportspeople in Cyprus